Becker County is a county in the U.S. state of Minnesota. As of the 2020 census, the population was 35,183. Its county seat is Detroit Lakes. Part of the White Earth Indian Reservation extends into the county. The county was created in 1858 and organized in 1871.

History
Becker County became a county on March 18, 1858. It was named for George Loomis Becker, one of three men elected to Congress when Minnesota became a state. Since Minnesota could only send two, Becker elected to stay behind, and he was promised to have a county named after him.

Colonel George Johnston founded the city of Detroit Lakes in 1871. It grew quickly with the construction of the Northern Pacific Railroad. Johnston led settlers from New England to settle in this region. An 1877 election decided that Detroit Lakes, then known as Detroit, would become the county seat. Detroit won the election by a 90% majority. Frazee, Lake Park, and Audubon were also in the running.

In 1884, Detroit Lakes had many businesses, including two hotels, a bank, a newspaper, and an opera house. The first courthouse was built that year. In 1885, the first county fire department was constructed. In 1903, the Soo Line Railroad built a line through the county.

Detroit Lakes hosts a park dedicated to the Grand Army of the Republic. The city rededicated the park on April 15, 2015, marking the 150th anniversary of the end of the Civil War and the death of President Lincoln. Colonel Tom Mortenson and his wife, Pam, sponsored the rededication, representing the Women's Relief Corps, which spearheaded community support for the effort that included new signage for the park and a time capsule to be opened on the 200th anniversary.

Geography
The county terrain consists of low rolling hills, tree-covered and dotted with lakes and ponds. The terrain slopes to the west and north. Its highest point is a hill 2.1 miles (3.4 km) northeast of Wolf Lake, the site of the USFS Wolf Lake lookout tower, at 1,861' (567m) ASL. The next highest point is near its northwest corner, at 1,631' (497m) ASL.

Becker County has diverse topography. It is home to several hundred lakes, many acres of fertile farm land, and forested areas. Much of the land consists of hills and deciduous trees.

Major highways

  U.S. Highway 10
  U.S. Highway 59
  Minnesota State Highway 34
  Minnesota State Highway 87
  Minnesota State Highway 113

Adjacent counties

 Mahnomen County - north
 Clearwater County - northeast
 Hubbard County - northeast
 Wadena County - southeast
 Otter Tail County - south
 Clay County - west
 Norman County - northwest

Protected areas

 Atlanta State Wildlife Management Area
 Becker State Wildlife Management Area
 Callaway State Wildlife Management Area
 Frank State Wildlife Management Area
 Greenwater Lake Scientific and Natural Area
 Hamden Slough National Wildlife Refuge
 Hasca State Park (part)
 Lunde State Wildlife Management Area
 Melbye State Wildlife Management Area
 Ogema Springs State Wildlife Management Area
 Pednor State Wildlife Management Area
 Riparia State Wildlife Management Area
 Smoky Hills State Forest
 Tamarac National Wildlife Refuge
 Tamarac Wilderness
 Teiken-Dalve State Wildlife Management Area
 Two Inlets State Forest
 White Earth State Wildlife Management Area

Climate and weather

Demographics

As of the 2000 census, there were 30,000 people, 11,844 households, and 8,184 families in the county. The population density was 22.8/sqmi (8.81/km2). There were 16,612 housing units at an average density of 13 per square mile (5/km2). The racial makeup of the county was 89.35% White, 0.19% Black or African American, 7.52% Native American, 0.36% Asian, 0.01% Pacific Islander, 0.24% from other races, and 2.32% from two or more races. 0.77% of the population were Hispanic or Latino of any race. 32.2% were of German, 26.0% Norwegian and 5.2% Swedish ancestry.

There were 11,844 households, of which 31.3% had children under the age of 18 living with them, 57.1% were married couples living together, 7.9% had a female householder with no husband present, and 30.9% were non-families. 26.9% of all households were made up of individuals, and 12.6% had someone living alone who was 65 or older. The average household size was 2.49 and the average family size was 3.02.

The county population contained 26.6% under age 18, 7.1% from 18 to 24, 24.9% from 25 to 44, 24.9% from 45 to 64, and 16.4% 65 or older. The median age was 39. For every 100 females there were 99.4 males. For every 100 females 18 and over, there were 97.8 males.

The median income for a household in the county was $34,797, and the median income for a family was $41,807. Males had a median income of $29,641 versus $20,693 for females. The per capita income for the county was $17,085. About 8.5% of families and 12.2% of the population were below the poverty line, including 16.4% of those under 18 and 11.8% of those 65 and over.

2020 Census

Communities

Cities

 Audubon
 Callaway
 Detroit Lakes
 Frazee
 Lake Park
 Ogema
 Wolf Lake

Townships

 Atlanta Township
 Audubon Township
 Burlington Township
 Callaway Township
 Carsonville Township
 Cormorant Township
 Cuba Township
 Detroit Township
 Eagle View Township
 Erie Township
 Evergreen Township
 Forest Township
 Green Valley Township
 Hamden Township
 Height of Land Township
 Holmesville Township
 Lake Eunice Township
 Lake Park Township
 Lake View Township
 Maple Grove Township
 Osage Township
 Pine Point Township
 Riceville Township
 Richwood Township
 Round Lake Township
 Runeberg Township
 Savannah Township
 Shell Lake Township
 Silver Leaf Township
 Spring Creek Township
 Spruce Grove Township
 Sugar Bush Township
 Toad Lake Township
 Two Inlets Township
 Walworth Township
 White Earth Township
 Wolf Lake Township

Census-designated places

 Elbow Lake
 Osage
 Pine Point
 White Earth

Unincorporated communities

 Bucks Mill
 Cormorant
 Goldenrod
 Midway
 Oak Lake
 Pine Point
 Ponsford
 Richwood
 Rochert
 Shoreham
 Snellman
 Two Inlets

Lakes
 Big Cormorant Lake (Minnesota)
 Middle Cormorant Lake
 Upper Cormorant Lake
 Little Cormorant lake
 Nelson lake
 Erickson Lake
 Lake Melissa
 Detroit Lake
 Lake Sallie
 Lake Maud

Government and politics
Becker County voters have voted Republican in recent decades. As of 2020, the county has selected the Democratic nominee for president in only one election since 1980.

In popular culture 
Becker County is the setting of the 2006 independent film Sweet Land, though it was filmed in Chippewa County.

A popular YouTube channel, CBOYSTV films, is headquartered in Becker County. CBoysTV is an American comedy and motorsports channel run by five men. The channel has amassed over a million subscribers.

Images

See also
 National Register of Historic Places listings in Becker County, Minnesota

References

External links
 Becker County government’s website

 
Minnesota counties
1871 establishments in Minnesota